Daviesia brachyphylla is a species of flowering plant in the family Fabaceae and is endemic to the south-west of Western Australia. It is a spreading to bushy shrub with cylindrical phyllodes with a slightly downcurved point and orange, maroon and red flowers.

Description

Taxonomy and naming
Daviesia brachyphylla was first formally described in 1844 by Carl Meissner in Lehmann's Plantae Preissianae from specimens collected by James Drummond. The specific epithet (brachyphylla) means "short-leaved".

Distribution and habitat
This species of pea grows in mallee heathland, low kwongan heathland and woodland on the Darling Range from near Moora to Hyden and Ravensthorpe, in the Avon Wheatbelt, Coolgardie, Esperance Plains, Jarrah Forest, Mallee and Swan Coastal Plain biogeographic regions in the south-west of Western Australia.

Conservation status
Daviesia brachyphylla is classified as "not threatened" by the Government of Western Australia Department of Biodiversity, Conservation and Attractions.

References

brachyphylla
Eudicots of Western Australia
Plants described in 1844
Taxa named by Carl Meissner